Antti-Jussi Karnio (born 14 March 1978) is a Finnish football player currently playing for JJK.

See also
Football in Finland
List of football clubs in Finland

References

External links
Guardian Football

1978 births
Living people
Finnish footballers
JJK Jyväskylä players
FF Jaro players
Veikkausliiga players
Association football goalkeepers